Bareto is a music group from Peru, famous for making their own versions of Peruvian Cumbia classic hits.

They also play and record their own material, and had been nominated for the Latin Grammy Awards for their self penned albums "Ves lo que quieres ver" (2012) and "Impredecible" (2015).

The band’s musical explorations began with Jamaican ska and reggae, but quickly, and not giving up that original influence, Bareto then focused in Amazonian Cumbia and its psychedelic universe. Soon the experiment took shape in the studio album “Cumbia”, released in 2008, which pushed Bareto to a national success in their hometown, a peak never reached before by a band from the alternative circuit.

The band’s next step forward leads them to become a confirmed reference of contemporary music in Perú, which Bareto spreads around the world during various tours, last of them consisting in a month long trip connecting 7 concerts in Canada (with their debut at the prestigious Montréal International Jazz Festival) and 12 dates among Europe, including Portugal, Spain, France, Austria, Sweden, Stonie and their first ever concert in Russia.

Beginnings (2003- 2005)
The group was formed in 2003, following the tradition of 70’s Peruvian groups like Black Sugar and Los Belkings. 
In 2005, they released the EP “Ombligo”: 5 songs recorded live of which only 500 copies were made. It featured 3 original songs as a four-piece (Ombligo, Bambam, and Tarantino) and two covers, Cantaloop Island (Herbie Hancock) and Marcus Gravey (Burning Spear). These last two were recorded live including a wind section for the first time.

 	Ombligo (Joaquín Mariátegui)
 	Tarantino (Joaquín Mariátegui)
 	Bam Bam (Joaquin Mariategui)
	Cantaloop Island (Herbie Hancock)
 	Marcus Garvey (Burning Spear)

Boleto (2006-2007) 
By 2006, they were ready to release their proper debut album, Boleto, where the band mixed reggae and ska punk with Latin beats, including Cumbia, in songs like "La Calor" and their version of "La del Brazo" (originally by Peruvian rock group Fragil).  The album was recorded at Iempsa Studios by Tato del Campo. It features nine original songs that combine reggae, ska punk and funk, with tropical and Latin moods. The album was an evolution in sound with the addition of percussion and a wind section to the lineup.
 "La fuga de Túnez"
 "Bam Bam"
 "Kincha"
 "Bebop Marley"
 "La del brazo"
 "La calor"
 "Boleto"
 "Ombligo"
 "Tarantino"
 "Choque y fuga"

Cumbia (2008)

In September 2008, and taking advantage of the newfound respect for typical Peruvian Cumbia, Bareto release their sophomore album “Cumbia”, composed entirely by  Peruvian Cumbia and popular Latin songs. The album gave the band a strong commercial push, with versions of popular Amazonia and Andean cumbia from Juaneco y Su Combo, Los Mirlos, and Los Shapis. The album also features Wilindoro Cacique on vocals.

“Cumbia” reached the gold record status for its sales in just 3 months after it was released.

	Vacilando con ayahuasca
	Ya se ha muerto mi abuelo
	Mujer hilandera
	A la fiesta de San Juan
	Soy provinciano
	El aguajal
	Caballo viejo
	El Brujo (Fachín)
	Un shipibo en España
	Llorando se fue
	La danza de los mirlos

Sodoma y Gamarra (2009)

By the end of 2009, Bareto releases Sodoma y Gamarra, an album which has the band searching for new sounds, fusing Peruvian sounds with world music. The song “No juegue con el diablo” was part of the soundtrack for the soap opera “Los Exitosos Gomes”. The song “La Distancia” features Dina Paucar.

	Pa' todos hay
	No juegue con el diablo (single)
	La distancia
	Ceja de selva
	El Chui Chui
	Sodoma y Gamarra

Ves lo que quieres ver (2012)

In 2012, Bareto released “ves lo que quieres ver”, an album which goes deeper into the sounds they had previously worked with, but with a stronger social component in the lyrics. The first single is called “Camaleon”.

The new album also marks the bands transition into the international market and was backed by tours in Japan, United States and Brazil.

The group also shared the stage in 2012 with highly successful Manu Chao, former Mano Negra, in his show in Peru.

Impredecible (2015) 
With Bareto’s last long effort, Impredecible, released in November 2015, the band is getting a deeper international reach thanks to the English label World Village (Harmonia Mundi).

The tracks “La voz del Sinchi”, “Viejita guarachera” and “La semilla” has been aired in radios in France as Nova and Fip. Despite the enduring influence of Peruvian Psychedelic Cumbia, Bareto did not stick to this reference in their latest album, which takes us from instrumental cumbia with “La Voz del Sinchi,” to a deep dub atmosphere in “Viejita Guarachera” passing by festejo with the song “El Loco”. The Afro Peruvian diva Susana Baca featured this last track.

The album has also been the opportunity for the band to include electronic elements thanks to the support in production of Felipe Alvarez (Polen Records, Colombia).

References

Peruvian musical groups